The Cleveland Guardians are a Major League Baseball franchise based in Cleveland, Ohio. They play in the American League Central division. Also known as the Cleveland Blues (1901), Cleveland Broncos (1902), Cleveland Naps (1903–1914), and Cleveland Indians (1915–2022), pitchers for the Guardians have thrown 14 no-hitters in franchise history. A no-hitter is officially recognized by Major League Baseball only "when a pitcher (or pitchers) allows no hits during the entire course of a game, which consists of at least nine innings. In a no-hit game, a batter may reach base via a walk, an error, a hit by pitch, a passed ball or wild pitch on strike three, or catcher's interference." No-hitters of less than nine complete innings were previously recognized by the league as official; however, several rule alterations in 1991 changed the rule to its current form.  No-hitters are rare, but every team in Major League Baseball has had a pitcher accomplish the feat. Two perfect games, a special subcategory of no-hitter, have been thrown in Guardians history. As defined by Major League Baseball, "in a perfect game, no batter reaches any base during the course of the game." These feats were achieved by Addie Joss on October 2, 1908 and by Len Barker on May 15, 1981.

Bob Rhoads threw the first no-hitter in Guardians history on September 18, 1908; the most recent no-hitter was thrown by Barker on May 15, 1981. No left-handed pitchers have thrown no-hitters in franchise history while all were by right-handers. Nine no-hitters were thrown at home and five on the road. They threw four in April, two in May, two in June, three in July, two in September, and one in October. The longest interval between no-hitters in franchise history was between the games pitched by Barker and incumbent pitcher, encompassing over 39 years from May 15, 1981 till present. Conversely, the shortest interval between no-hitters was between the games pitched by Rhoads and Joss, encompassing merely 14 days from September 18, 1908 till October 2, 1908. They no-hit the Chicago White Sox the most, which occurred thrice, which were no-hit by Joss (in 1908 and 1910) and Bob Feller (in 1940). There is one no-hitter which the team allowed at least a run, which was done by Rhoads in 1908. The most baserunners allowed in a no-hitter were by Feller (in 1940) and Don Black (in 1947), who each allowed six. Of the 14 no-hitters, five have been won by a score of 1–0, more common than any other results. The largest margin of victory in a no-hitter was a 9–0 win by Wes Ferrell in 1931. The smallest margin of victory was a 1–0 wins by Joss in 1908 and 1910, Feller in 1940 and 1946, and Dennis Eckersley in 1977; and 2–1 win by Rhoads in 1908.

The umpire is also an integral part of any no-hitter. The task of the umpire in a baseball game is to make any decision "which involves judgment, such as, but not limited to, whether a batted Ball is fair or foul, whether a pitch is a strike or a Ball, or whether a runner is safe or out… [the umpire's judgment on such matters] is final." Part of the duties of the umpire making calls at home plate includes defining the strike zone, which "is defined as that area over homeplate (sic) the upper limit of which is a horizontal line at the midpoint between the top of the shoulders and the top of the uniform pants, and the lower level is a line at the hollow beneath the kneecap." These calls define every baseball game and are therefore integral to the completion of any no-hitter. 11 different umpires presided over each of the franchise's 14 no-hitters.

The manager is another integral part of any no-hitter. The tasks of the manager is to determine the starting rotation as well as batting order and defensive lineup every game. Managers choosing the right pitcher and right defensive lineup at a right game at a right place at a right time would lead to a no-hitter. 11 different managers have led to the franchise's 14 no-hitters.

List of no-hitters in Guardians history

See also
List of Major League Baseball no-hitters

References

No-hitters
Cleveland Guardians